Exchange Building, also known as Center Building, Center Hall, and the Grange Building is a historic commercial building located at Newark in New Castle County, Delaware.  It was built in 1880 and is a three-story rectangular, stucco coated building with a five bay facade.  It features a deep mansard roof enclosing the third floor and covered in slate in the Second Empire style.  A prison cell dated to about 1905 is located in the building's basement when, reportedly, a courthouse was located at this address. A barber shop has operated in the same location on the first floor of the Exchange Building for over 100 years. Klondike Kate's, a restaurant, occupies the rest of the ground floor.

It was added to the National Register of Historic Places in 1982.

References

Commercial buildings on the National Register of Historic Places in Delaware
Second Empire architecture in Delaware
Commercial buildings completed in 1880
Buildings and structures in Newark, Delaware
1880 establishments in Delaware
National Register of Historic Places in New Castle County, Delaware